Alan Samuel Lyle-Smythe MBE, M.C. (9 November 1914 – 1 October 2006), who wrote under the name Alan Caillou, was an English-born author, actor, screenwriter, soldier, policeman and professional hunter.

Biography
Alan Lyle-Smythe was born in Surrey, England. Prior to World War II, he served with the Palestine Police from 1936 to 1939 and learned the Arabic language. He was awarded an MBE in June 1938. He married Aliza Sverdova in 1939, then studied acting from 1939 to 1941.

In January 1940, Lyle-Smythe was commissioned in the Royal Army Service Corps. Due to his linguistic skills, he transferred to the Intelligence Corps and served in the Western Desert, in which he used the surname "Caillou" (the French word for 'pebble') as an alias.

He was captured in North Africa, imprisoned and threatened with execution in Italy, then escaped to join the British forces at Salerno. He was then posted to serve with the partisans in Yugoslavia. He wrote about his experiences in the book The World is Six Feet Square (1954). He was promoted to captain and awarded the Military Cross in 1944.

Following the war, he returned to the Palestine Police from 1946 to 1947, then served as a Police Commissioner in British-occupied Italian Somaliland from 1947 to 1952, where he was recommissioned a captain. He wrote about this experience in the memoir Sheba Slept Here.

After work as a District Officer in Somalia and professional hunter, Lyle-Smythe travelled to Canada, where he worked as a hunter and then became an actor on Canadian television.

Writing career
He wrote his first novel, Rogue's Gambit, in 1955, first using the name Caillou, one of his aliases from the war. Moving from Vancouver to Hollywood, he made an appearance as a contestant on the 23 January 1958 edition of You Bet Your Life.

He appeared as an actor and/or worked as a screenwriter in such shows as Daktari, The Man From U.N.C.L.E. (including the screenwriting for "The Bow-Wow Affair" from 1965), Thriller, Daniel Boone, Quark, Centennial, and How the West Was Won. In 1966-67, he had a recurring role (as Jason Flood) in NBC's "Tarzan" TV series starring Ron Ely. Caillou appeared in such television movies as Sole Survivor (1970), The Hound of the Baskervilles (1972, as Inspector Lestrade), and Goliath Awaits (1981). His cinema film credits included roles in Five Weeks in a Balloon (1962), Clarence, the Cross-Eyed Lion (1965), The Rare Breed (1966), The Devil's Brigade (1968), Hellfighters (1968), Everything You Always Wanted to Know About Sex* (*But Were Afraid to Ask) (1972), Herbie Goes to Monte Carlo (1977), Beyond Evil (1980), The Sword and the Sorcerer (1982) and The Ice Pirates (1984).

Caillou wrote 52 paperback thrillers under his own name and the nom de plume of Alex Webb, with such heroes as Cabot Cain, Colonel Matthew Tobin, Mike Benasque, Ian Quayle and Josh Dekker, as well as writing many magazine stories. He also wrote books under female names.

Several of Caillou's novels were filmed, such as Rampage with Robert Mitchum in 1963, based on his big game hunting knowledge; Assault on Agathon (with Nico Minardos as Cabot Cain), for which Caillou did the screenplay as well; and The Cheetahs, filmed in 1989.

Personal life
He was married to Aliza Sverdova from 1939 until his death.  Their daughter Nadia Caillou (7 October 1952 – 5 February 2019) was the screenwriter for Skeleton Coast (1987).

Death
Alan Caillou died in Sedona, Arizona in 2006.

Partial filmography

Journey to the Center of the Earth (1959) — Rector (uncredited)
Seven Thieves (1960) — Doctor Gerald Halsey (uncredited)
The Fiercest Heart (1961) — Major Adrian
Pirates of Tortuga (1961) — Ringose (uncredited)
It Happened in Athens (1962) — Narrator (voice)
Five Weeks in a Balloon (1962) — Inspector
Bonanza (TV series, 1962–1970) — Walter Craigsmuir / Jim Hare (2 episodes)
The List of Adrian Messenger (1963) — Insp. Seymour (uncredited)
Signpost to Murder (1964) — Dr. Upjohn (uncredited)
Strange Bedfellows (1965) — Magistrate (uncredited)
Clarence, the Cross-Eyed Lion (1965) — Carter
The Rare Breed (1966) — Taylor
Tarzan (1966 TV series)#Season 1: 1966–67 Season 1, Episode 1: Eyes of the lion (1966) — Jason FloodThe Devil's Brigade (1968) — Gen. MarlinHellfighters (1968) — Harry YorkSole Survivor (1970) — AlbanianThe Hound of the Baskervilles (1972, TV Movie) — Inspector LestradeEverything You Always Wanted to Know About Sex* (*But Were Afraid to Ask) (1972) — The Fool's FatherDixie Dynamite (1976) — EnglishmanHerbie Goes to Monte Carlo (1977) — EmileBeyond Evil (1980) — Police InspectorGauguin the Savage (1980) — Inspector AumontThe Sword and the Sorcerer (1982) — King SanchoThe Ice Pirates'' (1984) — Count Paisley (final film role)

Notes

Sources
 

1914 births
2006 deaths
20th-century British short story writers
20th-century English male actors
20th-century English male writers
20th-century English memoirists
20th-century English novelists
20th-century English screenwriters
20th-century pseudonymous writers
Recipients of the Military Cross
British Army personnel of World War II
British colonial police officers
English television writers
English male television actors
English male film actors
English male screenwriters
English spy fiction writers
English thriller writers
English travel writers
English male short story writers
English short story writers
English male novelists
Royal Army Service Corps officers
Intelligence Corps officers
Jewish insurgency in Mandatory Palestine
Male actors from Surrey
Members of the Order of the British Empire
English male non-fiction writers
British male television writers